The 1979 season was São Paulo's 50th season since club's existence.

Statistics

Scorers

Overall
{|class="wikitable"
|-
|Games played || 45 (43 Campeonato Paulista, 2 Friendly match)
|-
|Games won || 17 (16 Campeonato Paulista)
|-
|Games drawn || 18 (15 Campeonato Paulista, 2 Friendly match)
|-
|Games lost || 13 (12 Campeonato Paulista)
|-
|Goals scored || 51
|-
|Goals conceded || 42
|-
|Goal difference || +9
|-
|Best result || 3–0 (H) v Portuguesa - Campeonato Paulista - 1979.07.223–0 (H) v Velo Clube - Campeonato Paulista - 1979.09.26
|-
|Worst result || 0–3 (H) v Santos - Campeonato Paulista - 1979.10.28
|-
|Top scorer || Serginho (14)
|-

Friendlies

Official competitions

Campeonato Paulista

Record

External links
official website 

Association football clubs 1979 season
1979
1979 in Brazilian football